Rafeeq Ahmed (born 17 December 1961) is a Malayalam poet, lyricist and novelist. He has won the Kerala Sahitya Akademi Award for Poetry and is a five-time winner of the Kerala State Film Award for Best Lyrics. With more than 600 songs in his credit, Rafeeq Ahamed is regarded as the most successful and critically acclaimed lyricist of contemporary Malayalam cinema.

Early life 
Rafeeq Ahamed was born to Syed Sajjad Hussain and Thithayikutty on 17 December 1961 in Akkikavu, Trichur. He graduated in English literature from Sree Krishna College, Guruvayur.

Literary career
Rafeeq Ahamed authored a number of poems. Some of his collections include Swapnavangmoolam, Paarayil Paninjathu, Aalmara and Cheettukalikkar. He won the Kerala Sahitya Akademi Award for Poetry in 2006 for the collection Aalmara. He is also a recipient of Vyloppilli Award, Odakkuzhal Award and P. Kunhiraman Nair Award. He also authored the novel Azhukkillam which was serialised in Mathrubhumi Illustrated Weekly and published as a book in 2015.

Film career
He started his film career through the 1999 film Garshom directed by P. T. Kunju Muhammed. His second work as a lyricist was  Perumazhakkalam , directed by Kamal. It was music director M. Jayachandran who suggested Rafeeq to Kamal, based on an experience of working with Rafeeq for the title song of a television serial Samanathaalam. Rafeeq penned the lyrics of much acclaimed song  Rakkilithan for perumazhakalam and has since written more than 600 songs for about 300 Malayalam films.

Bibliography 
Poetry collections

Novel 
 Azhukkillam (2015)

Partial filmography

Awards

Literary awards 
 Odakkuzhal Award for Rafeeq Ahammedinte Kavithakal (2014)
 Kerala Sahitya Akademi Award for Alamara (2006)
 Olappamanna Memorial Award for Paarayil Pathiinjathu (2000)
 Edappally Award
 Kunchupilla Award
 Kanakasree Award
 Vailoppilli Award
 P. Kunjiraman Nair Award (2017)
 Ulloor Award
 Swathi-Ayyappa Panicker Literary Award (2019)

Film awards

References

External links 

 Column at The Indian Express

Living people
1961 births
Indian male poets
21st-century Indian Muslims
Malayali people
Writers from Thrissur
Poets from Kerala
Malayalam poets
Malayalam-language writers
Malayalam-language lyricists
Recipients of the Kerala Sahitya Akademi Award
20th-century Indian poets
Malayalam novelists
Indian male novelists
20th-century Indian novelists
Novelists from Kerala
Malayalam screenwriters
Indian lyricists
Screenwriters from Kerala
21st-century Indian male writers